"I Can See for Miles" is a song by the English rock band the Who, recorded for the band's 1967 album The Who Sell Out. Written by guitarist Pete Townshend, it was the only song from the album to be released as a single.

Recording
Recorded in several separate sessions in studios across two continents, the recording of "I Can See for Miles" exemplifies the increasingly sophisticated studio techniques of rock bands in the late 1960s, such as those used for the Beatles and the Beach Boys. The backing tracks were recorded at CBS Studios in London, the vocals and overdubbing were performed at Talentmasters Studios in New York, and the single was mixed and mastered at Gold Star Studios in Los Angeles. The initial UK mono pressing (Track Records) and the US Decca single has an overdubbed second bass line mixed upfront, whilst the drums are mixed slightly lower.

Critical reception
The song is ranked number 40 on Dave Marsh's "The 1001 Greatest Singles Ever Made", number 37 on NME's "The Top 100 Singles of All-Time", and number 162 on Pitchfork's "The 200 Greatest Songs of the 1960s."  Billboard described the single as a "compelling off-beat number full of excitement and drive," stating that a "strong dance beat supports smooth vocal blend with top production work."  Cash Box said that it's a "solid, thumping, hard-driving, discotheque-styled rock stand" that's "a real powerhouse." In a review for AllMusic, Richie Unterberger called "I Can See for Miles" "one of the greatest Who songs", adding that it also features "one of Keith Moon's greatest performances" and "one of the best drum parts ever on a rock record".

It was ranked number 262 on [[Rolling Stone's 500 Greatest Songs of All Time|Rolling Stone'''s 500 Greatest Songs of All Time]] list in 2010. It is also ranked number 2 on the magazine's list of the band's best songs. According to Acclaimed Music, it is the 350th most celebrated song in popular music history.

Charts and legacy
"I Can See for Miles" reached number 10 in the UK Singles Chart. In the US, it peaked at number 9, the group's highest showing on the Billboard Hot 100 and in Canada, it reached number four.  Though Townshend had high hopes for the single, it ended up charting lower than most of the group's records up to that time. He wrote the song in 1966, but had held it back as an "ace in the hole", believing it would be the Who's first number-one single: "To me it was the ultimate Who record, yet it didn't sell. I spat on the British record buyer", Townshend later commented.

The song may have inspired the Beatles' "Helter Skelter". Paul McCartney recalls writing "Helter Skelter" after reading a review of The Who Sell Out'' in which the critic claimed that "I Can See for Miles" was the "heaviest" song he had ever heard. McCartney had not heard the song but wrote: "Helter Skelter" in an attempt to make an even "heavier" song than the one praised in the review, "to be the most raucous vocal, the loudest drums, et cetera".

References

The Who songs
1967 singles
British psychedelic rock songs
Songs written by Pete Townshend
Track Records singles
Song recordings produced by Kit Lambert
1967 songs
CSI: Cyber
Television drama theme songs